Septula Steez Sebogodi (born October 31, 1962) is a South African actor and singer.  He is the recipient of two SAFTA Awards.
He made appearance on Critical Assignment (2004), The Republic (2019) and soap opera Rhythm City, Scandal!.

Career

Acting
His career in acting began in the early ’90s in the local Pedi drama Bophelo Ke Semphekgo, playing the role of the womanizing Nkwesheng.

He went on to be a series regular in the long-running sitcom suburban Bliss. In 2005 he was playing the role of Kenneth Mashaba on Generations. In 2015 he had a role of Solomon on e.tv soapie Rhythm City. He also appeared on Woman king(2022).

Music
Seputla is a recording gospel artist he has released two albums, his second album was released in 2010 titled Re Tshwarele Melato.

Personal life
He has married three times and is the father of four children sons Thapelo, Kgothatso, Sebogodi and daughter Thabang.

Discography

Studio albums
 Nkuke Morena
 Re Tshwarele Melato (2010)
 Buya (2015)

Select filmography
’’The Woman King’’ (2022)
Bophelo ke Semphekgo (1988)
Hijack Stories (2000)
The Long Run (2000)
Mr Bones (2001)
Beat the Drum (2003)
Critical Assignment (2004)
Max and Mona (2004)
The Story of Racheltjie De Beer (2019)
 The River
Sofa Silahlane South African movie 2017

References

External links
 

21st-century South African male actors
South African male film actors
South African male television actors
Living people
1962 births